Irvine Edward Francis (9 October 1902 – 5 December 1949) was a Canadian athlete. He competed in the men's pole vault at the 1924 Summer Olympics.

References

External links
 

1902 births
1949 deaths
Athletes (track and field) at the 1924 Summer Olympics
Canadian male pole vaulters
Olympic track and field athletes of Canada
Place of birth missing